Sinh may refer to:
 Hyperbolic sine, abbreviated as sinh, a mathematical function
 Sinh (clothing), a traditional women's garment from Southeast Asia
 Singh, an Indian title and personal name
 Sinhala script (ISO 15924 abbreviation: Sinh)

See also 
 
 SIMH, an emulator software
 Sinha